Umadashi Matsuri (Umadashi Festival) is an event typically held during Japanese Fall festivals. Young people grab onto the reins of horses and run through the sand with them.

References

External links
Azuma Shrine, Umadashi Festival, Japan National Tourism Organization

Festivals in Japan